Bedros Filippovich Kirkorov (born 2 June 1932 in Varna) is a Bulgarian and Russian singer and bandleader of Armenian origin. He was awarded the People's Artist of Russia title; and is the father of Philipp Kirkorov.

References

External links
 Biography
  Говорим Киркоров, подразумеваем Крикорян

1932 births
Living people
Musicians from Varna, Bulgaria
20th-century Bulgarian male singers
Soviet male singers
Bulgarian people of Armenian descent
Bulgarian emigrants to the Soviet Union
People's Artists of Russia
Recipients of the Medal of the Order "For Merit to the Fatherland" II class
Honored Artists of the Russian Federation